Luiz Humberto "Beto" da Silva Silva (born 28 December 1996) is a Peruvian footballer who plays as a forward for the club Club Deportivo Universidad César Vallejo and the Peru national team.

Club career

Youth career 
Da Silva was born in Lima, Peru, to a Brazilian father and a Peruvian mother. At the age of six, his family moved to Porto Alegre, Brazil, where he began playing for Internacional and later moving to Grêmio. In 2010, he moved back to Peru, where he had brief spells at Universitario and Universidad San Martín before joining Sporting Cristal youth team in 2011.

Sporting Cristal 
Da Silva made his professional debut for Sporting Cristal on 19 June 2013, aged 16, in a derby match against Alianza Lima for the Torneo Descentralizado. On 30 August 2014, he scored his first professional goal, against Los Caimanes. He ended up the 2014 season with 2 goals in 14 matches, as Sporting Cristal finished as league champions. In the following year, he managed to score more 6 goals in 21 matches.

PSV Eindhoven 
On 3 January 2016, Da Silva signed a two-and-half year contract with PSV Eindhoven. He immediately joined Jong PSV, who plays on Eerste Divisie.

Da Silva made his debut for Jong PSV on 18 January, replacing Ramon Lundqvist at the 76th minute in a 2–0 victory against MVV Maastricht in Eerste Divisie. On February 1, he scored his first goal, the late in a 3–1 win over RKC Waalwijk. In July, he appeared in a pre-season friendly against FC Porto.

On 6 January 2017, Da Silva was promoted to PSV Eindhoven's first team. On 14 January, he was an unused substitute in a 2–0 home victory against S.B.V. Excelsior, in the Eredivisie.

Grêmio 
On 20 January 2017, Da Silva returned to his childhood club Grêmio, signing a four-year contract.

Loan to Argentinos Juniors 
On 19 January 2018, Da Silva joined Argentine Primera División side Argentinos Juniors on a one-and-a-half-year loan deal with a buyout option.

Tigres UANL 
On 4 September 2018, Da Silva joined Liga MX side Tigres UANL.

Loan to Lobos BUAP 
On 1 January 2019, Da Silva joined Liga MX side Lobos BUAP.

Loan to Deportivo La Coruña 
On 2 September 2019, Da Silva returns to European football via a loan to Segunda División side Deportivo La Coruña for the entire 2019–20 season. The following 29 January, after seven goalless appearances, his loan was terminated.

International career 
Eligible to play for both Peru and Brazil through his descent, Da Silva represented Peru since the under-15 level. He was part of the Peru under-20 squad selected to play in the 2015 South American Youth Football Championship.

Da Silva made his senior debut on 23 May 2016, in a friendly match against Trinidad & Tobago, scoring the second goal in a 4–0 victory. Later, he was named in the 23-men squad to represent Peru in Copa América Centenario.

International goals 
Score and Result list Peru's goal tally first

Honours 
Sporting Cristal
Peruvian Primera División: 2014

Grêmio
Copa Libertadores: 2017

Personal life 
He is married with model Ivana Yturbe and they announced Ivana is pregnant on 30 May 2021.

References

External links 
 
 Player profile – Jong PSV
 Beto da Silva – Instagram

1996 births
Living people
Footballers from Lima
Peruvian people of Brazilian descent
Peruvian footballers
Association football forwards
Peruvian Primera División players
Sporting Cristal footballers
Eerste Divisie players
PSV Eindhoven players
Grêmio Foot-Ball Porto Alegrense players
Argentinos Juniors footballers
Liga MX players
Tigres UANL footballers
Lobos BUAP footballers
Segunda División players
Deportivo de La Coruña players
2015 South American Youth Football Championship players
Peru under-20 international footballers
Copa América Centenario players
Peru international footballers
Peruvian expatriate footballers
Peruvian expatriate sportspeople in the Netherlands
Peruvian expatriate sportspeople in Brazil
Peruvian expatriate sportspeople in Argentina
Expatriate footballers in the Netherlands
Expatriate footballers in Brazil
Expatriate footballers in Argentina
Expatriate footballers in Mexico